George Petros Efstathiou  (born 2 September 1955) is a British astrophysicist who is Professor of Astrophysics (1909) at the University of Cambridge and was the first Director of the Kavli Institute for Cosmology at the University of Cambridge from 2008 to 2016. He was previously Savilian Professor of Astronomy at the University of Oxford.

Education
Efstathiou was educated at Tottenham Grammar School which he left at age 16 and to which he returned as a lab technician. He then studied at Keble College, Oxford and the University of Durham where he was awarded a PhD in 1979.

Career and research
Efstathiou was a research assistant in the Astronomy Department of University of California, Berkeley from 1979 to 1980, then moved to the Institute of Astronomy at the University of Cambridge, holding research fellowships at King's College, Cambridge from 1980 to 1988. He was appointed Savilian Professor of Astronomy at the University of Oxford in 1988 (a post held in conjunction with a fellowship of New College, Oxford). 
He was Head of Astrophysics between 1988 and 1994. He returned to Cambridge in 1997 as Professor of Astrophysics (1909) and a fellow of King's College.  Efstathiou was Director of the Institute of
Astronomy between 2004 and 2008. He became the first Director of the Kavli Institute for Cosmology in 2008.

Efstathiou has made a number of notable contributions to research in cosmology, including: 
 With Marc Davis, Carlos Frenk and Simon White he pioneered the use of N-body computer simulations of cosmic structure formation.
 With J. Richard Bond he made the first detailed calculations of cosmic microwave background anisotropies in cold dark matter models. 
 With Steve Maddox, Will Sutherland and Jon Loveday he constructed the APM Galaxy Survey and measured large-scale galaxy clustering, providing early evidence for the now-standard Lambda CDM model.
 He was one of the originators of the 2dF Galaxy Redshift Survey, and provided confirmation of dark energy using measurements of large-scale structure.  
 He is one of the leaders of the science team for the Planck spacecraft, which (as of 2015) provides the best measurements of the cosmic microwave background.

Awards and honours
He was awarded the Maxwell Medal and Prize of the Institute of Physics in 1990. In 1994 he was both appointed a Fellow of the Royal Society (FRS), and was awarded the Bodossaki Foundation Academic and Cultural Prize for Astrophysics. Other awards include the Robinson Prize in Cosmology (Newcastle University, 1997) and the Dannie Heineman Prize for Astrophysics (American Institute of Physics and American Astronomical Society) in 2005, jointly with Simon White. He received the Gruber Prize in Cosmology for 2011 jointly with Marc Davis, Carlos Frenk and Simon White, the Nemitsas Prize in Physics for 2013 and the Hughes Medal of the Royal Society in 2015. In 2022 Efstathiou was awarded the Gold Medal of the Royal Astronomical Society, its highest honour whose previous recipients include Albert Einstein, Edwin Hubble and Fred Hoyle

References

Living people
Fellows of the Royal Society
Alumni of Keble College, Oxford
Fellows of King's College, Cambridge
Fellows of New College, Oxford
Savilian Professors of Astronomy
21st-century British astronomers
British people of Greek descent
Maxwell Medal and Prize recipients
Winners of the Dannie Heineman Prize for Astrophysics
1955 births
Alumni of Durham University Graduate Society
Professors of Astrophysics (Cambridge)
British cosmologists